Keith L. Truenow (born August 9, 1969) is an American politician serving as a member of the Florida House of Representatives from the 31st district. He assumed office on November 3, 2020.

Early life and education 
Truenow was born in St. Cloud, Minnesota in 1969. He moved to Florida with his family in 1979 and graduated from Leesburg High School.

Career 
Truenow served in the United States Air Force. He later founded Lake Jem Farms. He was elected to the Florida House of Representatives in November 2020. After assuming office, he was assigned to the House Judiciary Committee and House Joint Legislative Auditing Committee.

References

External links 

Living people
1969 births
People from St. Cloud, Minnesota
Republican Party members of the Florida House of Representatives
People from Tavares, Florida
21st-century American politicians
United States Air Force airmen